Nikol Płosaj (born 22 May 1996) is a Polish road and track cyclist, representing Poland at international competitions.

As a junior, she competed at the 2013 UCI Road World Championships in the women's junior road race and at the 2014 UCI Road World Championships in the women's junior road race. At the 2016 World University Cycling Championship she won the silver medal in both the road race and criterium.

She won the silver medal at the 2016 UEC European Track Championships in the team pursuit.

References

1996 births
Living people
Polish female cyclists
Polish track cyclists
Place of birth missing (living people)
Cyclists at the 2019 European Games
European Games medalists in cycling
European Games bronze medalists for Poland
21st-century Polish women